Keauhou Bay is a historic area in the Kona District of the Big Island of Hawaii.
The name comes from ke au hou which means "the new era" in the Hawaiian Language.

Kamehameha III's Birthplace

A small enclosure is maintained by the Daughters of Hawaii to mark the site of the birth of King Kamehameha III in 1814, the second son of Kamehameha I and Keopuolani.
The early part of his reign he was under a regency by Kaʻahumanu.
He was the longest reigning monarch in the Kingdom of Hawaii, until his death December 15, 1854.
The site includes the Kauikeaouli stone (his birth name), added to the Hawaii register of historic places as site 10-37-4383 on January 13, 1978.
It was added to the National Register of Historic Places on July 24, 1978 as site 78001018.

It is said Kauikeaouli was stillborn, but put on the stone by a visiting Kahuna where he was revived with a sacred chant.
The Daughters of Hawaii held a ceremony marking the hundredth anniversary by placing a plaque with Queen Liliuokalani in attendance.
They acquired the small parcel including the foundation of the house in 1925.

Other historic sites

To the north of this area is the Kahaluu Bay Historic District, and uphill (mauka) is the Keauhou Holua Slide built under Kamehameha I.
The Holua originally extended into Heeia Cove just north of the main bay.
To the south is the birth site of the Battle at Kuamoo, fought in 1819.

Recreation

The Keauhou area includes the Outrigger & Spa at Keauhou Bay, built in 1975, the  Keauhou Shopping Center, two golf courses, timeshare, residential and resort condominiums and single-family residences.
The largest convention center in Kona is located at the Sheraton, just South of the bay.
The  of the resort are owned by a subsidiary of Kamehameha Schools
which sponsors cultural events at the facilities.

There is a small boat ramp for public use and commercial tour companies such as Dolphin Discoveries to Kealakekua Bay, and the Keauhou Canoe Club for canoe races.
Above the bay the Kona Country Club golf course, built in 1966, was designed by William Bell.   Another route south to the town of Kealakekua is the Alii bypass road, a bizarre monument to a conflict between property developers and the County.

References

Gallery

Bays of Hawaii (island)
Monuments and memorials on the National Register of Historic Places in Hawaii
Beaches of Hawaii (island)